The 2014 European Weightlifting Championships were held in Tel Aviv, Israel from 3 to 13 April 2014.

Schedule
All times are local (UTC+3).

Medal overview

Men

Women

Medals tables 
Ranking by Big (Total result) medals

Ranking by all medals: Big (Total result) and Small (Snatch and Clean & Jerk)

Participating countries
List of participating countries. In total 37 countries participate in this championships.

External links
Official website
IWF results
Results Book

European Weightlifting Championships
2014 in weightlifting
International weightlifting competitions hosted by Israel
2014 in Israeli sport
Weightlifting, 2014 European Championships
2010s in Tel Aviv
April 2014 sports events in Europe